Southern Copper Corporation is a mining company that was founded in 1952. The current incarnation of Southern Copper can be traced to the 2005 acquisition of Southern Peru Copper Corporation by the Mexican copper producer Minera México.

88.9 percent of Southern Copper is owned by Mexican mining conglomerate Grupo México (per proxy statement dated March 27, 2018) . Based on 2007 reserves data, Southern Copper is the world's largest publicly traded copper mining company and the world's seventh largest copper mining company based on 2007 sales. In addition, the firm is the eighth largest copper smelting company. The firm ranks among the world's largest producers of molybdenum, silver, and zinc.

The company is a major producer and refiner of copper, molybdenum, zinc, silver, lead, and gold, and operates mines and smelters in Mexico and in Peru, in the Andes mountains southeast of Lima.

Since 2012, the company has made major strides in improving their production methods. During 2013, 60.7 million dollars in environmental capital expenditures were spent on the following programs: water recovery systems to conserve water and minimize impact on nearby streams; vegetation programs to stabilize the surface of the tailings dumps; implementation of scrubbing technology in the mines to reduce dust emissions. For these continued efforts towards sustainable practices, the company was awarded with the Fray International Sustainability Award in 2014. CEO M. Oscar Gonzalez Rocha, appeared in Mexico for the SIPS 2014/Shechtman International Symposium to accept this award on the company's behalf.

Major operations
The firm's operations are primarily within southern Peru and northern Mexico.

Operations in southern Peru
Southern Peruvian operations include the mines located at the Cuajone and Toquepala mines. The two mines produced a total of 359,655 tons of copper in 2007, with Cuajone producing 182,117 tons and Toquepala producing 177,538 tons respectively.

A recent strike at the largest mine, Cuajone, was suspended pending mediation between the two parties. 

Tia Maria is a copper project mine which has been granted the environmental approval by the Peruvian Ministry of Energy and Mining (MINEM) to move forward with the project development. Geoservice Ingeniería was the engineering and consulting firm in charge of executing satisfactory the Environmental Impact Assessment (EIA) studies, the EIA approval was received on August 1, 2014, with directorial resolution Nº392-2014-MEM/DGA-AM given by MINEM.

The social protest against the project started in March 2015, causing tens of injuries and up to the beginning of May 2015, two deaths have also led to massive strikes and road blocks in the region. Local farmers fear the open-pit project will contaminate water supplies and cover their crops in dust.

Operations in Mexico
The Cananea Mine, located in northern Mexico, produced 98,503 tons of copper in 2007. It is among the world's largest copper mines in terms of reserves, and has the longest remaining mine life of any major open-pit copper mine in the world, based on current production levels.

La Caridad Mine, located in northern Mexico, produced 124,972 tons of copper in 2007.

References

External links
 http://www.southerncoppercorp.com/
 http://www.azcentral.com/business/articles/2008/06/23/20080623biz-copper0623.html
 http://finance.google.com/finance?q=NYSE:PCU
 http://uk.reuters.com/article/rbssIndustryMaterialsUtilitiesNews/idUKN2142100020080721
 http://www.azstarnet.com/allheadlines/249953

Companies listed on the New York Stock Exchange
Copper mining companies of Mexico
Companies established in 1952
1952 establishments in Mexico